The Numismatic Museum of Athens is one of the most important museums in Greece and it houses a collection of over 500,000 coins, medals, gems, weights, stamps and related artefacts from 1400BC to modern times. The collection constitutes one of the richest in the world, paralleled by those of the British Museum in London, the Bibliothèque Nationale in Paris, the State Hermitage Museum in St. Petersburg, the Bode Museum in Berlin, and the American Numismatic Society in New York. The museum itself is housed in the mansion of the archaeologist Heinrich Schliemann, formally known as Iliou Melathron ("Palace of Ilion").

History

The first attempts at coin collecting by the state began shortly after the independence of Greece in Aegina. The collection was enriched after excavations, purchases and donations. The museum was founded in 1838, around the same era with the National Archaeological Museum, but it was not until many years after and several decrees that it became an independent organization. Initially, the collection was a part of the National Library of Greece and was housed at the main building of the University of Athens and later at the building of the Academy of Athens where the collection was first exhibited. In 1946, the collection was moved to the National Archaeological Museum. The organization of the museum became twice independent, in 1893 and 1965.

The Iliou Melathron was granted in order to house the collection in 1984, and after a major renovation it finally opened in 1998.

The Iliou Melathron

The Numismatic Museum is housed at the Iliou Melathron, a three-story building on Panepistimiou Street. It was built between 1878 and 1880 for Heinrich Schliemann and the architect was the then famous Ernst Ziller. At the time of its completion, it was considered to be the most magnificent private residence of Athens. Its design was inspired by the Renaissance Revival movement as well as Neoclassicism, while the interior is influenced by the architecture of Pompeii. As a result, the rooms are decorated with mosaics and murals depicting either themes from the Trojan War or Greek mottos. In 1927, the widow of Heinrich Schliemann, Sophia, sold the building to the Greek State and it was subsequently used as the seat of the Council of State and later the Court of Cassation.

The use of the building as a courthouse caused much damage. After the building was chosen to house the Numismatic Museum, it underwent a major renovation under which the floor mosaics and the murals were restored. Finally, the numismatic collection was inaugurated in the partly restored building in 1998 while the whole collection became viewable in 2007.

Collections

The collection of the museum contains 600,000 objects, mainly coins but also medals, standard masses, dies, stamps and others, from the 14th century BC until modern times. The collection is arranged in such a way so as to follow the history of coinage. The museum holds a very important collection of coins from the 6th century BC until the 5th century CE like those from the Greek Poleis and the Hellenistic and Roman periods. There also major Byzantine and Medieval collections from Western Europe, the East and the Ottoman Empire.

A large portion of the collection is constituted by coins that were found in hoards while the rest comes from the initial collection of Aegina, recent excavations in mainland Greece and donations.

The museum houses a library of 12,000 books specialized in the study of coinage. There is also a conservation laboratory.

Location and visitor information

The Numismatic Museum is on 12 Panepistimiou Street near Syntagma Square. It is served by the Syntagma metro station. There is a museum shop and a coffeehouse in the garden.

Gallery

See also 
 List of museums in Greece
 List of museums with major numismatic collections
 Ancient Greek coinage
 Byzantine coinage
 Ioannis Svoronos

References

Great Greek Encyclopedia, vol. XVIII, Athens, 1932

External links
 Numismatic Museum official site
 Hellenic Ministry of Culture and Tourism
 www.athensinfoguide.com
Numismatic Museum of Athens within Google Arts & Culture

Museums in Athens
Archaeological museums in Athens
Athens
Museums of ancient Greece in Greece
Archaeological collections in Greece